Anthony Liu (born 6 June 1987 in Faga'alu) is an American Samoan judoka.

He qualified for the 2012 Summer Olympics Men's 100 kg competition where he lost in the round of 32 to Jevgeņijs Borodavko.

References

External links
 

1987 births
Living people
People from Faga'alu
American people of Samoan descent
American Samoan male judoka
Judoka at the 2012 Summer Olympics
Olympic judoka of American Samoa